George H. Reed was an American actor working in the Hollywood film industry in both the silent and sound eras. His first major film was the 1920 Huckleberry Finn where he played Jim. He is also remembered for the film The Green Pastures (1936), which featured an all–African American cast, and the orderly Conover in MGM's Dr. Kildare series.

Selected filmography

Huckleberry Finn (1920) - Jim (film debut)
The Veiled Mystery (1920) - Tom
One a Minute (1921) - J. Wellington Norcross - Townsman (uncredited)
A Virginia Courtship (1921)
The Jungle Goddess (1922) - Native guide
The Bishop of the Ozarks (1923) - Simon
Scars of Jealousy (1923) - Mose
Red Lights (1923) - Porter
Cameo Kirby (1923) - Croup (uncredited)
The Vagabond Trail (1924) - George Romain
Helen's Babies (1924) - Rastus - the coachman
The Fast Worker (1924) - Train Porter (uncredited)
The Isle of Hope (1925) - Cook
Kentucky Pride (1925) - Trainer
The Golden Strain (1925) - Butler
Danger Quest (1926) - Umhatten
The Johnstown Flood (1926) - Camp Cook (uncredited)
Winning the Futurity (1926) - Uncle Mose
Pals First (1926) - Uncle Alex
The Rough Riders (1927) - Minor Role (uncredited)
The Noose (1928) - Death Row Inmate (uncredited)
The Clean-Up Man (1928) - Sambo
The Big City (1928) - Black Waiter (uncredited)
Three-Ring Marriage (1928) - Valet
Absent (1928)
River of Romance (1929) - Rumbo
They Learned About Women (1930) - Train Porter (uncredited)
Montana Moon (1930) - Train Porter (uncredited)
The Divorcee (1930) - Second Porter (uncredited)
Love in the Rough (1930) - Train Porter (uncredited)
Reducing (1931) - Train Porter (uncredited)
Trails of the Golden West (1931)
Father's Son (1931) - Pullman Porter Johnson
Sweepstakes (1931) - Cook's Helper (uncredited)
Smart Money (1931) - George - a Porter (uncredited)
Secret Service (1931) - Wagon Driver (uncredited)
Reducing (1931) - Les, Wagon Driver
The Gay Caballero (1932) - Train Porter (uncredited)
Murder at Dawn (1932) - The Taxi Driver (uncredited)
What Price Hollywood? (1932) - Minor Role (uncredited)
Bachelor's Affairs (1932) - Men's Room Attendant (uncredited)
The Golden West (1932) - Jasper the Coachman (uncredited)
Bed of Roses (1933) - Alice - Dan's Shipboard Cook (uncredited)
Hold Your Man (1933) - Reverend Crippen (uncredited)
Life in the Raw (1933) - Porter (uncredited)
The Last Trail (1933) - Japonica Jones
The House on 56th Street (1933) - James - Lyndon's Butler (uncredited)
Massacre (1934) - Chief Black Star (uncredited)
Carolina (1934) - Minor Role (uncredited)
A Modern Hero (1934) - Paul's Butler (uncredited)
The Witching Hour (1934) - Train - Prentice's Butler (uncredited)
Twentieth Century (1934) - Uncle Remus in Play (uncredited)
Murder in Trinidad (1934) - Watchman on Telephone (uncredited)
Judge Priest (1934) - Black Servant (uncredited)
Belle of the Nineties (1934) - Brother Eben (uncredited)
The Curtain Falls (1934) - Jim - Elevator Operator (uncredited)
Mrs. Wiggs of the Cabbage Patch (1934) - Julius
A Notorious Gentleman (1935) - Charles (uncredited)
Wings in the Dark (1935) - Waring - Valet (uncredited)
The Glass Key (1935) - Black Servant (uncredited)
Lady Tubbs (1935) - Railroad Porter (uncredited)
Don't Bet on Blondes (1935) - Marilyn's Butler (uncredited)
Diamond Jim (1935) - Porter (uncredited)
Red Salute (1935) - Butler (uncredited)
The Virginia Judge (1935) - Rufus (uncredited)
Shipmates Forever (1935) - Tom, Melville's Servant (uncredited)
The Prisoner of Shark Island (1936) - Black Man Giving Booth Directions (uncredited)
The Country Beyond (1936) - Porter (uncredited)
Show Boat (1936) - Old Black Man (uncredited)
The Green Pastures (1936) - Mr. Deshee
Anthony Adverse (1936) - Crippled Black Man (uncredited)
Oh, Susanna! (1936) - Fireman (uncredited)
The Gorgeous Hussy (1936) - Braxton (uncredited)
After the Thin Man (1936) - Dudley (uncredited)
We Who Are About to Die (1937) - Black Convict (uncredited)
Wings Over Honolulu (1937) - Fauntleroy (uncredited)
The Go Getter (1937) - Butler for J. Browne #2 (uncredited)
This Is My Affair (1937) - Watchman in Capitol (uncredited)
Saratoga (1937) - Butler (uncredited)
One Mile from Heaven (1937) - Peabody (uncredited)
The Buccaneer (1938) - Nicodemus, a Servant
City Girl (1938) - Elevator Operator (uncredited)
One Wild Night (1938) - Waiter (uncredited)
Josette (1938) - Butler
The Toy Wife (1938) - Gabriel - Satoris' Servant (uncredited)
Kentucky (1938) - Ben
Going Places (1938) - Sam
Calling Dr. Kildare (1939) - Black Man with Stomach Trouble (uncredited)
The Secret of Dr. Kildare (1939) - Conover, Gillespie's Attendant
Swanee River (1939) - Old Joe, McDowell's Coachman
Dr. Kildare's Strange Case (1940) - Conover, Gillespie's Attendant
Sporting Blood (1940) - Stonewall
Maryland (1940) - Uncle Henry (uncredited)
Manhattan Heartbeat (1940) - Porter
Dr. Kildare Goes Home (1940) - Conover, Gillespie's Attendant
Dr. Kildare's Crisis (1940) - Conover, Gillespie's Attendant
The Great Lie (1941) - Greenfield's Butler (uncredited)
The People vs. Dr. Kildare (1941) - Conover, Gillespie's Attendant
Kiss the Boys Goodbye (1941) - George, House Servant
Dr. Kildare's Wedding Day (1941) - Conover, Gillespie's Attendant
Belle Starr (1941) - Old Jake (uncredited)
They Died with Their Boots On (1941) - Charles (uncredited)
Dr. Kildare's Victory (1942) - Conover, Gillespie's Attendant
Reap the Wild Wind (1942) - Black Servant at Tea (uncredited)
Mississippi Gambler (1942) - Roy
Take a Letter, Darling (1942) - Sam French
In This Our Life (1942) - Fitzroy's Butler (uncredited)
Tales of Manhattan (1942) - Christopher (Robeson sequence)
The Loves of Edgar Allan Poe (1942) - Mose (uncredited)
Mrs. Wiggs of the Cabbage Patch (1942) - Butler in Olcott Home (uncredited)
Dr. Gillespie's New Assistant (1942) - Conover, Gillespie's Attendant
Dixie (1943) - Lucius (uncredited)
Someone to Remember (1943) - John (uncredited)
Is Everybody Happy? (1943) - Missouri
His Butler's Sister (1943) - Train Conductor (uncredited)
Chip Off the Old Block (1944) - Theodore (uncredited)
The Adventures of Mark Twain (1944) - Comet-Watcher (uncredited)
3 Men in White (1944) - Conover, Gillespie's Attendant
Home in Indiana (1944) - Tuppy (uncredited)
Barbary Coast Gent (1944) - Josephus - Bellamy's Servant (uncredited)
Heavenly Days (1944) - Bigbee's Servant (uncredited)
Jungle Queen (1945, Serial) - Tonga (uncredited)
Between Two Women (1945) - Conover, Gillespie's Attendant (uncredited)
Strange Illusion (1945) - Benjamin
Dangerous Partners (1945) - Porter (uncredited)
Nob Hill (1945) - Black Man at El Dorado (uncredited)
Pride of the Marines (1945) - Train Porter (uncredited)
Saratoga Trunk (1945) - Carriage Driver, New Orleans (uncredited)
Two Guys from Milwaukee (1946) - Clarence - the Porter (uncredited)
The Sea of Grass (1947) - Uncle Nat (uncredited)
The Michigan Kid (1947) - Steve's Servant (uncredited)
The Homestretch (1947) - Dee Dee (uncredited)
Dark Delusion (1947) - Conover, Gillespie's Attendant (final film role)

References

External links

1866 births
1952 deaths
African-American male actors
Male actors from Georgia (U.S. state)
American male silent film actors
American male film actors
Actors from Macon, Georgia
20th-century American male actors
20th-century African-American people